Migros is Switzerland's largest retail company, its largest supermarket chain and largest employer. It is also one of the forty largest retailers in the world. It is structured in the form of a cooperative federation (the Federation of Migros Cooperatives), with more than two million members.

It co-founded Turkey's largest retailer, Migros Türk, which became independent of Migros Switzerland in 1975.

The name comes from the French "mi" for half or mid-way and "gros", which means wholesale. Thus the word connotes prices that are halfway between retail and wholesale. The logo of the company is a large orange M.  Migros is often referred to as "the orange giant" (German: oranger Riese, French: géant orange, Italian: gigante arancio), an expression presumably borrowed from Germany, where Deutsche Telekom is often referred to as i.e. "the pink giant"

History
Migros was founded in 1925 in Zürich as a private enterprise by Gottlieb Duttweiler, who had the idea of selling just six basic foodstuffs at low prices to householders who, in those days, did not have ready access to markets of any kind. At first he sold only coffee, rice, sugar, pasta, coconut fat and soap from five lorries that went from one village or hamlet to another. The strategy to cut the intermediate trade and their margins led to the broad resistance of his competitors who goaded the producers to boycott him. As a reaction to this threat, Migros started creating its own line of goods beginning with meat, milk and chocolate.

Duttweiler and his drivers expanded their inventory and, in 1926, the first market opened its doors in Zürich. His second store, in Ticino, presaged the future as it was founded as a cooperative. By 1941, the energetic entrepreneur had built a number of markets but, in that year, he basically gave the business to his customers by transforming everything from his privately owned enterprises into regional cooperatives, headed by the Federation of Migros Cooperatives.

As early as 1935, Duttweiler showed his zest for expansion by founding the Hotelplan travel agency. In 1942, the Migros brand was applied to a weekly magazine, Wir Brückenbauer (now known as Migros Magazin). Other ventures were restaurants in 1952, gasoline stations (Migrol) in 1954, language schools (Eurocentres) in 1956, the Migros Bank in  1957 and an insurance company in 1959.

In 1948, the economist Elsa Gasser convinced Duttweiler to introduce the self-service approach in Migros stores, paving the way for the development of Switzerland's most successful supermarket chain. 

On behalf of the Migros Federation, the Zürich-based Reederei Zürich AG ordered at the H. C. Stülcken Sohn shipyard in Hamburg, Germany, the cargo ship Adele which was launched on 15 July 1952; the ship was christened by Adele Duttweiler, the wife of Gottlieb Duttweiler.

In 1954 Migros entered the Turkish market, forming Migros Türk in partnership with the Istanbul City Council. This was sold to the Turkish conglomerate Koç Holding in 1975 and is the largest retailer in Turkey. Between 2008 and 2011, Koç Holding sold most of its shares of Migros Türk to BC Partners. It would not be until 1993 for Migros to open another foreign supermarket, this time in Thoiry, near Geneva.

1986 saw Migros' first recreation park, Säntispark, in Abtwil.

In 1995, Migros introduced its organic label "Migros Bio" (products which follow the Bio Suisse guidelines). In 2017, it added a specific label for organic products containing at least 90% Swiss ingredients ("Migros Bio Suisse").

In October 2012, Migros expanded in the German market by acquiring the Hessian food store chain Tegut. In the same year, Migros opened the first Swiss store of German organic supermarket chain Alnatura.   In 2013, however, the company announced the sale to the REWE retail group of its four Migros-branded stores in Germany, the first of which had established in 1995 in Lörrach, near Basel.

In 2016, Migros announced that it would phase-out free plastic bags at check-out. Migros had tested the measure in the Canton of Vaud since 2013: the measure had reduced the number of plastic bags distributed by ninety percent (and saved 100,000 francs per year). Migros was the first to introduce the measure across the country, on 1 November 2016. The company also announced that profits from the remaining sale of plastic bags would be invested in environmental projects.

Philosophy 
Gottlieb Duttweiler was concerned of the health of his customers and decided that Migros would not sell any alcoholic beverages nor any tobacco. It is still the case today; although Denner, owned by the Migros group, does sell alcoholic beverages and cigarettes.

Here is a summary of some characteristics of Migros and its "responsible" philosophy:
 Does not sell any alcoholic beverages nor any tobacco;
 Does not pay any dividend;
 If the earnings before interest and taxes (EBIT) reaches 5% of the market value of the company, the supermarkets have to lower their prices;
 Organised as a cooperative (federation of regional cooperatives), with more than two million shareholders;
 Every adult living in Switzerland can become a member (receive a share for free) and vote at the general assembly;
 Uses 0.5% of its revenue to social and cultural projects.

Adèle and Gottlieb Duttweiler also wrote their "fifteen theses" (1950) which, without being legally binding, are an ethical heritage of Migros. It contains values and guidance such as a goal of "serving the community", "The general principle that we profess is to place people at the center of the economy" and "The general interest will be placed higher than the interests of the Migros cooperatives".

The company attracted controversy, however, when in 1977 it fired its most outspoken internal critic, Hans A. Pestalozzi, who was then working for the Gottlieb Duttweiler Institute, a think tank whose goal was to investigate the shortcomings of capitalism in modern society.

In 2021, Migros began considering alcohol sales in its supermarkets. A June 2022 vote was held and the sale of alcohol was rejected by each of the ten regional cooperative by an overwhelming majority of their members.

Migros today 

To this day, Migros keeps the cooperative society as its form of organisation. A large part of the Swiss population are members of the Migros cooperative – around 2 million of Switzerland's total population of 8.4 million, thus making Migros a supermarket chain that is owned by its customers. More than 90% of the assortment of goods is produced by ninety subsidiaries of Migros.

It has obligated itself to spend one percent of its annual turnover for financing cultural projects in a broad sense; the sub-organisation taking care of this is called Migros Kulturprozent ("cultural percent").

The supermarkets are categorized in the three size classes of M, MM and MMM. The firm's loyalty card is the M-cumulus card (a play on the word accumulate and a type of cloud formation).

M-Budget and Migros Sélection 

In 1996, influenced by the budget ranges in supermarket chains in Australia, Migros made their budget range called M-Budget with seventy products aimed at those with low incomes and large families. Now it has grown to 330 products including mountain bikes, snowboards, mp3 players, milk chocolate, jeans, shoes and lighters. M-Budget products have a standardized packaging color scheme, consisting of a grass green background with the Migros logo in small white text repeated over it.

Many of these products are produced in limited quantities rather than as an integral, permanent part of the Migros line. Whether they become permanent depends on their success. This, combined with the considerable brand recognition that Migros enjoys, conveys a certain amount of desirability to the rarer products. As a result, M-Budget items will sometimes be considered collectibles, as it is not always sure that they will ever be produced again.

To promote the range in the early 2000s Migros developed M-Budget Party tickets costing 9.90 CHF including free non-alcoholic drinks (cola, lemonade and orange juice) and snacks (crisps, chocolate and cakes).

In 2005, together with Swisscom, Migros launched M-Budget Mobile, a pay-as-you-go MVNO mobile virtual network operator.

Also in 2005, Migros introduced a premium line called Migros sélection, featuring for the most part food products typically associated with higher budgets and prepared in different fashions than is available through general stock. Sélection products also have their distinctive packaging, with pearl white and gold color schemes.

In April 2006, Migros announced the M-Budget credit card, an initiative between the Federation of Migros Cooperatives, GE Money Bank and MasterCard, originally with an annual rate of CHF 4.40, which was very low compared to credit card annual rates of CHF 100 for a MigrosBank MasterCard Argent credit card. The card was ready by the autumn 2006. After Coop, the biggest competitor of Migros, announced a credit card without any annual rate, Migros scrapped its annual charge.

Companies

M-Industry 

A large part of the products sold in the Migros supermarkets are produced by its own companies (M-Industry), mostly in Switzerland. In 2017, M-Industry comprises 32 companies, 25 of which are in Switzerland, and produce more than 20,000 products for the Migros supermarkets.

M-Industry companies include:

M-Industry products are exported to fifty countries, including China (under the name Orange Garten).

Globus group (formerly owned by Migros)  
Globus Group became part of Migros in 1997, but was sold to Signa Holding and Central Group in 2020.

 Interio: furniture stores, sold separately to Austrian XXXLutz Group in 2019 before being discontinued for good in 2020.
 Globus: premium department stores
 Globus Herren: menswear stores
 : office supplies (not the British Office Worlds, owned by Staples)
 Globi: a cartoon character who is mascot of the Globus Group, often referred to as Switzerland's Mickey Mouse.

Subito 
After some time, as their main competitor Coop, Migros also followed the idea of self-service checkout.

Competitors 
Migros's main competitor, Coop (Switzerland's second-largest supermarket chain), also has a cooperative structure like Migros, but with a more centralized organization. Smaller competitors include the Manor department-store chain, and more recently Aldi. Aldi, a very large  supermarket group internationally, opened its first Swiss shops in 2005, and thus operates just a few branches . A further competitor, Lidl, established its first Swiss supermarkets in March 2009.

In January 2007 Migros acquired 70 per cent Denner's shares, effectively merging the largest and third-largest food retail chains in Switzerland. According to both companies, the move took place in order for the Denner chain to better compete with increasing foreign competition.

See also 
 List of supermarket chains in Switzerland
 Park im Grüene

Notes and references

External links

Migros Switzerland website (in German, French & Italian)
Migros Germany website (in German)
Migros Sélection website (in German, French & Italian)
Sorgim's website
 

 
Swiss companies established in 1925
Retail companies established in 1925
Consumers' cooperatives in Switzerland
Retail companies of Switzerland
Supermarkets of Switzerland